Liberty Township, Missouri may refer to one of the following places in the State of Missouri:

Liberty Township, Adair County, Missouri
Liberty Township, Barry County, Missouri
Liberty Township, Bollinger County, Missouri
Liberty Township, Callaway County, Missouri
Liberty Township, Cape Girardeau County, Missouri
Liberty Township, Clay County, Missouri
Liberty Township, Cole County, Missouri
Liberty Township, Crawford County, Missouri
Liberty Township, Daviess County, Missouri
Liberty Township, Grundy County, Missouri
Liberty Township, Holt County, Missouri
Liberty Township, Iron County, Missouri
Liberty Township, Knox County, Missouri
Liberty Township, Macon County, Missouri
Liberty Township, Madison County, Missouri
Liberty Township, Marion County, Missouri
Liberty Township, Phelps County, Missouri
Liberty Township, Pulaski County, Missouri
Liberty Township, Putnam County, Missouri
Liberty Township, Saline County, Missouri
Liberty Township, St. Francois County, Missouri
Liberty Township, Schuyler County, Missouri
Liberty Township, Sullivan County, Missouri
Liberty Township, Stoddard County, Missouri
Liberty Township, Washington County, Missouri

See also
Liberty Township (disambiguation)

Missouri township disambiguation pages